Miss Teen USA 1992, the 10th anniversary of the Miss Teen USA pageant, was televised live from the Mississippi Coast Coliseum in Biloxi, Mississippi on 25 August 1992.

At the conclusion of the final competition, Jamie Solinger of Iowa was crowned by outgoing queen Janel Bishop of New Hampshire. Jamie is the first Miss Teen USA from Iowa. This marks the first (and so far only time) a candidate did not compete. In this case, Miss DC Teen USA was unable to go to Biloxi at the time being.

The pageant was hosted by Dick Clark for the third of four years, with color commentary by Leeza Gibbons in her third and final year, and Miss Teen USA 1990 Bridgette Wilson, for the only time. Music was provided by the Gulf Coast Teen Orchestra for the third consecutive year.

Host city
This was the third of five years that the pageant was held in Biloxi, and it was interrupted by the effects of Hurricane Andrew which devastated Florida and the Gulf Coast over the period the pageant was held.

Prior to the pageant, evacuation plans were in place for the pageant to evacuate to Mobile, Alabama or Jackson, Mississippi if weather conditions deteriorated.

The final competition was forced to be held early because of the hurricane threat, and the contestants were then bused further inland. This was the first time in the pageant's ten-year history that the event was not broadcast live. During the pre-recorded competition the crownings of both Jamie Solinger and first runner-up Angela Logan were filmed in an attempt to keep the result secret until the eventual broadcast of the event. Angela was told one hour before the evening telecast that Solinger had won and that she was the first runner-up.  The taping of two crownings became known as the "hurricane option" and would nearly be repeated at Miss Teen USA 1998 because of a live presidential address by Bill Clinton.

Results

Placements

Special awards

Scores

Historical significance 
 Iowa wins competition for the first time. Also becoming in the 9th state who wins Miss Teen USA.
 Oklahoma earns the 1st runner-up position for the first time.
 Kansas earns the 2nd runner-up position for the first time.
 Alabama finishes as Top 6 for the first time.
 California finishes as Top 6 for the first time.
 North Carolina finishes as Top 6 for the second time and repeats the same placement as the previous year.
 States that placed in semifinals the previous year were Indiana, Kansas, North Carolina, Oklahoma and Rhode Island. All of them made their second consecutive placement.
 California last placed in 1990.
 Alabama last placed in 1989.
 Illinois and Mississippi last placed in 1988.
 Virginia last placed in 1986.
 Iowa placed for the first time.
 Maryland placed for the first time.
 Georgia, Louisiana, Massachusetts and Missouri break an ongoing streak of placements since 1990.
 Texas breaks an ongoing streak of placements since 1988.

Delegates
The Miss Teen USA 1992 delegates were:

 Alabama - Christine King
 Alaska - Cindy Bridges
 Arizona - Heather Keckler
 Arkansas - Stacy Freeman
 California - Natasha Allas
 Colorado - Brandi Bryant
 Connecticut - Tiffany Selivonchik
 Delaware - Justine Jones
 Florida - Jennifer Sutter
 Georgia - Kristie Harmon
 Hawaii - Cameo DeCosta
 Idaho - Amanda Greenway
 Illinois - Julee Kleffman 
 Indiana - Nicole Llewellyn
 Iowa - Jamie Solinger
 Kansas - Danielle Boatwright
 Kentucky - Heather Bogess
 Louisiana - Evelyn Ellis
 Maine - Angela Walker
 Maryland - Vanessa Malinis
 Massachusetts - Victoria Grinder
 Michigan - WaLynda Sipple
 Minnesota - Elizabeth Peters
 Mississippi - Arleen McDonald
 Missouri - Robin Swain
 Montana - Aubrey Jo Hiller
 Nebraska - Marney Monson
 Nevada - Jennifer Gassmann
 New Hampshire - Angela Etter
 New Jersey - Lori Schmidt
 New Mexico - Hillary Matkin
 New York -  Amber Evans
 North Carolina - Rachel Lee Adcock
 North Dakota - Juliette Spier
 Ohio - Tiffany Chaney
 Oklahoma - Angela Logan
 Oregon - Maggie Molstrom
 Pennsylvania - Tara Lavan
 Rhode Island -  Shanna Moakler
 South Carolina - Shanen Pellerin
 South Dakota - Brandi Bower
 Tennessee - Angela Shoulders
 Texas - Carissa Blair
 Utah - Susan Kelly
 Vermont - Lisa Robie
 Virginia - Andrea Ballengee
 Washington - Kaley O'Kelley
 West Virginia - Kelly Humphrey
 Wisconsin - Trina Landowski
 Wyoming - Dondi Bowman

References

External links
Official website

1992
1992 beauty pageants
1992 in Mississippi